This is a list of candidates for the 1894 New South Wales colonial election. The election was held on 17 July 1894.

This election saw the Assembly reconstituted into single-member constituencies. As such it is impossible to determine which party notionally held each electorate.

Retiring members

Protectionist
Robert Barbour MLA (Murray)
James Torpy MLA (Orange)

Free Trade
William A'Beckett MLA (Bogan)
Robert Booth MLA (Bogan)
David Dale MLA (Central Cumberland)
James Eve MLA (Canterbury)
William Holborow MLA (Argyle)
James Inglis MLA (New England)
James Marks MLA (Paddington)
Bruce Smith MLA (Glebe)
Robert Wilkinson MLA (Balranald)

Independent
Jack Want MLA (Paddington) – Independent Free Trade
Thomas Williams MLA (Upper Hunter) – Independent Labor

Legislative Assembly
Sitting members are shown in bold text. Successful candidates are highlighted in the relevant colour. Where there is possible confusion, an asterisk (*) is also used.

See also
 Members of the New South Wales Legislative Assembly, 1894–1895

References
 

1894